Tall Khosrow (also Romanized as Tal-e Khosrow; also known as Tal-e Khosravī, Tall-e Khosrow-ye Soflá, and Tall Khosravī Pā’īn) is a village in Sarrud-e Jonubi Rural District, in the Central District of Boyer-Ahmad County, Kohgiluyeh and Boyer-Ahmad Province, Iran. At the 2006 census, its population was 1,822, in 366 families.

References 

Populated places in Boyer-Ahmad County
Populated places in Iran